Huguenot Farms is an unincorporated community in the city of Richmond, in the U.S. state of Virginia.

References

Unincorporated communities in Virginia